Clinohedrite is a rare silicate mineral.  Its chemical composition is a hydrous calcium-zinc silicate; CaZn(SiO4)·H2O.  It crystallizes in the monoclinic system and typically occurs as veinlets and fracture coatings. It is commonly colorless, white to pale amethyst in color. It has perfect cleavage and the crystalline habit has a brilliant luster. It has a Mohs hardness of 5.5 and a specific gravity of 3.28 - 3.33.

Under short wave ultraviolet light it fluoresces a rich orange color.  It is frequently associated with minerals such as hardystonite (fluoresces violet blue), esperite (fluoresces bright yellow), calcite (fluoresces orange-red), franklinite (non-fluorescent) and willemite (fluoresces green).

Clinohedrite was found primarily at the Franklin zinc mines in New Jersey, the type locality, but has also been reported from the Christmas mine, Gila County, Arizona, and the Western Quinling gold belt, Gansu Province, China.

It was first described in 1898 and was named for its crystal morphology from the Greek klino for incline, and hedra for face.

References

Calcium minerals
Nesosilicates
Zinc minerals
Monoclinic minerals
Minerals in space group 9
Minerals described in 1898